Now Winter 2007 is a compilation CD released by EMI Music Australia in 2007. It is the 17th CD in the Australian Now! series.

Track listing
Silverchair – "Straight Lines" (4:16)
Missy Higgins – "Steer" (3:47)
Thirsty Merc – "20 Good Reasons" (3:46)
Gia Farrell – "Hit Me Up" (3:14)
Gym Class Heroes – "Cupid's Chokehold" (3:56)
Sneaky Sound System – "UFO" (3:43)
Paolo Nutini – "Jenny Don't Be Hasty" (3:25)
Camille Jones vs. Fedde le Grand – "The Creeps" (3:21)
Robbie Williams with Pet Shop Boys – "She's Madonna" (4:15)
Hilary Duff – "With Love" (3:01)
Eskimo Joe – "Breaking Up" (3:21)
Candice Alley – "Before You Go" (3:35)
Vanessa Hudgens – "Come Back to Me" (2:45)
Thirty Seconds to Mars – "From Yesterday" (3:49)
Jamelia – "Beware of the Dog" (3:10)
Jesse McCartney – "Just So You Know" (3:25)
The Living End – "Rising Sun" (3:18)
Mims – "This Is Why I'm Hot" (4:15)
Nickelback – "If Everyone Cared" (3:35)
Sharam – "PATT (Party All the Time)" (3:44)
Jet – "Shine On" (3:43)
Lily Allen – "Alfie" (2:43)

External links
 NOW Winter 2007 @ Australian Charts

2007 compilation albums
Now That's What I Call Music! albums (Australian series)
EMI Records compilation albums